Ginés Barrientos, O.P. (1637 – November 13, 1698) was a Roman Catholic prelate who served as Auxiliary Bishop of Manila (1680-1698).

Biography
Ginés Barrientos was born in Barrueco Pardo Villa de Sayao, Spain and ordained a priest in the Order of Preachers. On April 29, 1680, Pope Innocent XI, appointed him Auxiliary Bishop of Manila and Titular Bishop of Troas. In 1681, he was consecrated bishop by Manuel Fernández de Santa Cruz y Sahagún, Bishop of Tlaxcala. He served as Auxiliary Bishop of Manila until his death on November 13, 1698.

Episcopal succession
While bishop, he was the principal co-consecrator of:
Felipe Fernandez de Pardo, Archbishop of Manila (1681); and
Andrés González, Bishop of Nueva Caceres (1686).

See also
Catholic Church in the Philippines

References

1637 births
1698 deaths
Bishops appointed by Pope Innocent XI
17th-century Roman Catholic bishops in the Philippines
Dominican bishops